Allen Edwards may refer to:
Allen Edwards (basketball) (born 1975), American basketball player and coach
Allen Edwards (cricketer) (1868–1961), Australian cricketer

See also
Alan Edwards (disambiguation)
Allan Edwards (disambiguation)
Al Edwards (disambiguation)